Amálie Švábíková (born 22 November 1999) is a Czech pole vaulter. She competed in the women's pole vault at the 2017 World Championships in Athletics.

References

External links
 

1999 births
Living people
Czech female pole vaulters
World Athletics Championships athletes for the Czech Republic
Place of birth missing (living people)
World Athletics U20 Championships winners
20th-century Czech women
21st-century Czech women